The United States Virgin Islands competed at the 1998 Winter Olympics in Nagano, Japan.

Bobsleigh

Luge

Women

References
 Official Olympic Reports
 Olympic Winter Games 1998, full results by sports-reference.com

External links
 

Nations at the 1998 Winter Olympics
Winter Olympics
1998 Winter Olympics